

Ministers

Local Government Administration

Parliamentary appointments

Government administrative staff

Heads of Institutions

Ambassadorial roles

Council of State

Other political appointments

See also
 Presidency of Nana Akufo-Addo
 Nana Akufo-Addo administration controversies

Notes
1.Cabinet does not include deputy ministers. Article 76(1) of the 1992 Constitution states that, "There shall be a cabinet which shall consist of the President, the Vice President and not less than ten and not more than nineteen Ministers of State".
2. Sarah Adwoa Safo doubles as Deputy Majority Leader.
3. A former Chief of Defense Staff of the Ghana Armed Forces.
4. A former Inspector General of Police.
5. Ex-officio member as per President of National House of Chiefs.

References

Lists of government ministers of Ghana